The Tremp Formation, alternatively described as Tremp Group, is a geological formation in the comarca Pallars Jussà, Lleida, Spain. The formation is restricted to the Tremp or Tremp-Graus Basin, a piggyback foreland basin in the Catalonian Pre-Pyrenees. The formation dates to the Maastrichtian to Thanetian, thus the formation includes the Cretaceous-Paleogene boundary that has been well studied in the area, using paleomagnetism and carbon and oxygen isotopes. The Tremp Formation was deposited in a continental to marginally marine fluvial-lacustrine environment characterized by estuarine to deltaic settings.

The Tremp Basin evolved into a sedimentary depression with the break-up of Pangea and the spreading of the North American and Eurasian Plates in the Early Jurassic. Rifting between Africa and Europe in the Early Cretaceous created the isolated Iberian microplate, where the Tremp Basin was located in the northeastern corner in a back-arc basin tectonic regime. Between the middle Albian and early Cenomanian, a series of pull-apart basins developed, producing a local unconformity in the Tremp Basin. A first phase of tectonic compression commenced in the Cenomanian, lasting until the late Santonian, around 85 Ma, when Iberia started to rotate counterclockwise towards Europe, producing a series of piggyback basins in the southern Pre-Pyrenees. A more tectonically quiet posterior phase provided the Tremp Basin with a shallowing-upward sequence of marine carbonates until the moment of deposition of the Tremp Formation, in the lower section still marginally marine, but becoming more continental and lagoonal towards the top.

Shortly after deposition of the Tremp Formation, the Boixols Thrust, active to the north of the Tremp Basin and represented by the Sant Corneli anticline, started a phase of tectonic inversion, placing upper Santonian rocks on top of the northern Tremp Formation. The main phase of movement of another major thrust fault, the Montsec to the south of the Tremp Basin, happened not before the Early Eocene. Subsequently, the western Tremp Basin was covered by thick layers of conglomerates, creating a purely continental foreland basin, a trend observed going westward in the neighboring foreland basins of Ainsa and Jaca.

Multiple specimens and newly described genera and species of crocodylians, mammals, turtles, lizards, amphibians and fish complete the rich vertebrate faunal assemblage of the Tremp Formation. Additionally, fresh-to-brackish water clams as Corbicula laletana, bivalves of Hippurites castroi, gastropods, plant remains and cyanobacteria as Girvanella were found in the Tremp Formation. The unique paleoenvironment, well-exposed geology, and importance as national heritage has sparked proposals to designate the Tremp Formation and its region as a protected geological site of interest since 2004, much like the Aliaga geological park and others in Spain.

Due to the exposure, the interaction of tectonics and sedimentation and access, the formation is among the best studied stratigraphic units in Europe, with many universities performing geological fieldwork and professional geologists studying the different lithologies of the Tremp Formation. The abundant paleontological finds are displayed in the local natural science museums of Tremp and Isona, where educational programs have been established explaining the geology and paleobiology of the area. In 2016, the Tremp Basin and surrounding areas were filed to become a Global Geopark, and on April 17, 2018, UNESCO accepted this proposal and designated the site Conca de Tremp-Montsec Global Geopark. Spain hosts the second-most Global Geoparks in the world, after China.

Etymology 
The Tremp Formation was defined and named in 1968 by Mey et al., just as the Tremp Basin after the Pre-Pyrenean town of Tremp. The various subdivisions of the formation or alternatively called group, are named after the villages, rivers, canyons and hills in the basin.

Description 

The formation is found in the Tremp-Graus Basin, a piggyback basin enclosed by the Sant Corneli anticline in the north, the Boixols Thrust in the northeast, the Montsec Thrust in the south and the Collegats Formation in the west. The Tremp-Graus Basin is bordering the Ainsa Basin to the west, and the Àger Basin to the south. The basin is subdivided into four synclinal areas, from east to west Vallcebre, Coll de Nargó, Tremp and Àger. While in Benabarre, the Tremp Formation overlies the Arén Formation, in Fontllonga the formation rests on top of the Les Serres Limestone. The formation is partly laterally equivalent with the Arén Formation. The Tremp Formation is stratigraphically overlain by the late Paleogene, locally called Ilerdiense, Àger Formation and the Alveolina Limestone, though in many parts of the Tremp Basin the formation is exposed and covered by alluvium.

The formation comprises several different lithologies, as sandstones, shales, limestones, marls, lignites, gypsum beds, conglomerates and siltstones have been registered.

The start age of the Tremp Formation has been established on the basis of the presence of Abathomphalus mayaroensis, a planktonic foraminiferan indicative of the latest Maastrichtian age of the formation. The lower section of the formation at the Elías site has been dated at 67.6 Ma, while the top of the Tremp Formation, in the western portion of the basin overlain by the Alveolina Limestone, named due to the abundance of Alveolina, is set at 56 Ma.

On the northern side of the Axial Zone of the Pyrenees, in the French sub-Pyrenean zone and Aquitaine Platform of the foreland basin bordering the mountain range, the time-equivalent stratigraphic units of the Tremp Formation are the Mas d'Azil Formation and Marnes d'Auzas Formation for the latest Maastrichtian, the Entonnoir Formation for the Danian and the Rieubach Group correlating with the Thanetian portion of the Tremp Formation.

Subdivisions 
Studies performed in the 1990s described the Tremp Formation, also called Garumnian, as a group with a subdivision into:

Claret Formation 
 Etymology - Claret
 Type section - along the road 1311
 Thickness - up to 
 Lithologies - ochre to red shales, gypsum beds and intercalated sandstones and conglomerates
 Depositional environment - transitional marine to continental

La Guixera Member
 Etymology - La Guixera
 Type section - Mongai
 Thickness - 
 Lithologies - gypsum beds alternating with shales, sandstones and conglomerates
 Depositional environment - evaporitic lacustrine deposits at times of retrogradation of alluvial fans

Esplugafreda Formation 

 Etymology - Esplugafreda canyon
 Type section - Barranco de Esplugafreda, in the valley of the Ribagorçana River east of Areny de Noguera
 Thickness - 
 Lithologies - continental red beds; shales, sandstones and conglomerates
 Depositional environment - alluvial fans

Sant Salvador de Toló Formation 
 Etymology - Sant Salvador de Toló
 Type section - Conquès River
 Thickness - 
 Lithologies - micritic limestones and greenish shales
 Depositional environment - lacustrine to coastal

Talarn Formation 

 Etymology - Talarn
 Type section - Barranco de La Mata
 Thickness - 
 Lithologies - fining-upward sequence of sandstones and conglomerates at the base, grading into siltstones and shales near the top
 Depositional environment - alluvial channel and overbank deposits

Conquès Formation 
 Etymology - Conquès River
 Type section - Barranco de Basturs
 Thickness - 
 Lithologies - greenish shales, sandstone lenses and conglomerates at the base
 Depositional environment - perilagoonal

Tossal d'Obà Member
 
 Etymology - Tossal d'Obà
 Type section - Tossal d'Obà Hill
 Thickness - 
 Lithologies - micritic limestones and marls
 Depositional environment - distal fluvial to lagoonal-barrier island

Basturs Member
 Etymology - Basturs
 Type section - Barranco de Basturs
 Thickness - 
 Lithologies - micritic limestones, greenish shales and bioturbated fine sandstones
 Depositional environment - perilagoonal

Posa Formation 

 Etymology - Ermita La Posa
 Type section - Isona anticlinal
 Thickness - 
 Lithologies - grey shales, limestones, marls, lignite and sandstones
 Depositional environment - lagoonal to barrier island

Alternative subdivisions 
An alternative subdivision uses Grey Garumnian at the base, overlain by Lower Red Garumnian and Vallcebre Limestone at the top. The Vallcebre limestone is laterally equivalent with another described unit, the Suterranya Limestone. Pujalte and Schmitz in 2005 defined another member, the Claret Conglomerate, as representative of a conglomeratic bed inside the Claret Formation.

In 2015, a new unit was allocated to the uppermost Cretaceous section of the Tremp Group, near the top of the Lower Red Garumnian.

Tectonic evolution 

The Tremp Basin was formed in the northeastern corner of the Iberian Plate, a microplate that existed as a separate tectonic block between the Eurasian and African Plates since the Hercynian orogeny that formed the supercontinent Pangea. Progressive opening of the Atlantic Ocean between the Americas and at first Africa, later Iberia and finally Europe, caused large differential motions between these continents, with extensional tectonics starting in the Early Jurassic with the opening of the Neotethys ocean between southwestern Europe and Africa. During this period, evaporites were deposited in the rift basins, later in the tectonic history becoming important décollement surfaces for the compressional movements. The phase of extension continued into the Early Cretaceous when the Iberian Plate started to move counterclockwise to converge with the Eurasian Plate.

Back-arc basin 
Approximately from the late Berriasian to late Albian (120 to 100 Ma), the Iberian Plate was an isolated island, separated from current southern France by a mostly shallow sea with a deeper pelagic channel in between the southwestern Eurasian and northeastern Iberian coasts. The Tremp Basin, alternatively called Organyà Basin, was the depocenter of sedimentation during the late Early Cretaceous, showing an estimated vertical sedimentary thickness of  comprising mostly hemipelagic marls and limestones, deposited in a back-arc basin setting with normal faults parallel to the Pyrenean axis, and cross-cut by transverse faults, separating the various west-to-east minibasins. These minibasins showed a deepening trend from the Gulf of Biscay to the Mediterranean.

At the end of formation of the back-arc basin, around 95 Ma, high temperature metamorphism developed as a result of crustal thinning synchronously or
immediately after the Albian to Cenomanian basin formation. Lower crustal granulitic rocks, as well as ultramafic upper mantle rocks (lherzolites) were emplaced along the prominent North Pyrenean Fault (NPF) crustal feature. The North Pyrenean Fault developed during the sinistral (left-lateral) displacement of the Iberian Plate, which age is determined by the age of flysch pull-apart basins formed synchronously with the strike-slip movement along the NPF from Middle Albian to Early Cenomanian. This period is characterized by a local unconformity in the Tremp Basin, while this is not registered farther to the west of the Pre-Pyrenean minibasins near Pont de Suert.

Tectonic inversion 
The previous phase was followed by a tectonically more quiet setting in the basins surrounding the slowly rising Pyrenees. Research published in 2014 has revealed a renewed phase of evaporitic deposition from the Coniacian to Santonian in the Cotiella Basin, west of the Tremp Basin. The relative tectonic quiescence lasted until the late Santonian, approximately around 85 Ma, with other authors defining this moment at 83 Ma. At this time, continental subduction and back-arc basin inversion commenced, with the remainder of the Neotethys Ocean progressively disappearing. As is common in inverted tectonic regimes, the normal faults of the early Mesozoic were reactivated into reverse faults at the end of the Cretaceous and continuing into the Paleogene. The lithospheric subduction has not been interpreted from seismic reflection data, with the ECORS profile obtained in the late 1980s as primary example, due to the large thickness and poor seismic resolution, but later analysis using tomography has identified this feature below the Pre-Pyrenean chain. The presence of lithospheric subduction is a common feature in other Alpine orogenic chains as the Alps and Himalayas.

Piggyback basin 
From the late Santonian to the late Maastrichtian, on the different thrust sheets of the southward compressional Pre-Pyrenees, a series of piggyback basins were formed, one of which was the Tremp Basin. The bathymetry of these basins show a general deepening towards the west, with major turbidite deposition in the Ainsa Basin and farther west. Subsequent ongoing inversion of the basins show a similar trend, with compressional phases becoming younger from east to west. While the onlap and erosion in the Clamosa area started in the early Eocene, around 49 Ma, the western portion experienced this phase terminating around the end of the Eocene, approximately at 35 Ma. In the Jaca Basin, to the west of the Ainsa and Tremp Basins, during the Middle Eocene, flysch was deposited in an underfilled basin setting, while in the western Tremp Basin thick conglomerates, known as the Collegats Formation, were deposited, sourced by the various thrust sheets in the hinterland.

Boixols and Montsec thrusting 
The Boixols–Cotiella thrust sheet was emplaced since the Late Cretaceous, placing late Santonian rocks on top of the northernmost Tremp Formation, found in the subsurface underneath the Sant Corneli anticline. This was followed by the tectonic movement of the Montsec–Peña Montañesa thrust sheet during the Early Eocene and the western Sierras Exteriores thrust sheet from the Mid-Eocene to Early Miocene. The dating of the Montsec Thrust has been established on the basis of the stratigraphies of the overlying hanging wall (Triassic to Cretaceous) onto the Lutetian (locally called Cuisian) fluvial sediments of the Àger Basin to the south of the Montsec. These tectonic movements are indicative of the main uplift phase of the Pyrenees.

Salt tectonics 
The involvement of evaporites as décollement surfaces in compressional tectonic regimes is a widespread phenomenon on Earth. The evaporites, mainly salt but also gypsum, function as mobile ductile surfaces along which thrust faults can move. Global examples of halokinesis in compressional inverted tectonic regimes include the south Viking Graben, and Central Graben in the North Sea, offshore Tunisia, the Zagros mountains of Iraq and Iran, northern Carpathians in Poland, western, and eastern Colombian, along the Eastern Frontal Fault System of the Eastern Ranges of the Andes, the Al Hajar Mountains of Oman, Dnieper-Donets Basin in the Ukraine, the Sivas Basin in Turkey, the Kohat-Potwar fold and thrust belt of Pakistan, the Flinders Ranges in South Australia, during the Eurekan orogeny in the Sverdrup Basin of northeastern Canada and western Greenland, and many more.

In the western Cotiella Basin, salt inflation and withdrawal played a major role in the differential sedimentary thicknesses, facies changes and tectonic movements.

Eocene to recent 
After the Middle Eocene, thick conglomerates were deposited in the western Tremp Basin and the thrust sheets reached their maximum displacement, this led to a shift of the depocenter from the Pre-Pyrenees towards the Ebro Basin. Paleomagnetic data show that the Iberian Plate went through another phase of counterclockwise rotation, though not as fast as in the Santonian. Between 25 and 20 Ma, in the late Oligocene and early Miocene, a rotation of 7 degrees has been noted. This phase of rotation correlated with the thrusting in the westernmost areas of the southern Pre-Pyrenees, the Sierras Marginales, leading to continental conditions in that area from the early Miocene (Burdigalian) onwards.

Depositional history 

The depositional environment of the Tremp Formation varies between continental, lacustrine, fluvial, and marginally marine (estuarine to deltaic and coastal). The continental deposits in the east of the basin have been interpreted as the distal part of alluvial fans, while the presence of cyanobacteria Girvanella in the lacustrine limestones indicates variability in salinity in the lacustrine areas and a possible lateral relation with transitional environments. The presence of great quantities of the fungus Microcodium indicates traces of rootlets. The biochemical data, based on C and O isotope analysis could indicate a rise in temperature, an increase in evaporation and a higher production of plant material at the transition of Maastrichtian and Paleocene. The top of the Tremp Formation is close to the Paleocene–Eocene Thermal Maximum, which could explain the relative lack of diversity in mammal genera.

Four phases in the depositional history of the Tremp Formation are noted:
 Formation of an estuarine regime near the end of a Cretaceous regression in the Pyrenean basins, characterized by coastal plains where thick clays were deposited, cut by sporadic fluvial channels. At the margins of the basin, swampy conditions existed with sedimentation of carbonates. In these zones, the last dinosaurs inhabiting the area before the Cretaceous-Paleogene boundary left their marks in tracks, eggs and bones. These areas were accompanied by marshes, as evidenced by the many plant remains that produced the lignite deposits found in the lower part of the Tremp Formation. During this first phase in the sedimentary sequence of the formation, the Montsec was already a slightly elevated area in the south and along the submerged slopes of that hill, lacustrine limestones were deposited.
 At the end of the Cretaceous, a geologically sudden drop of sea level happened, giving rise to a wide fluvial-dominated basin. In this environment, river channels deposited sandstones and abundant overbank clays with numerous paleosols in the basin. On the southern side of the rising Montsec, the Àger Basin, a similar fluvial system developed with a far more coarse-grained sandy character than in its northern counterpart around Tremp. The paleocurrents in the Àger Basin were towards the north and northwest. The enclosed continental basin turned into a more coastal environment at a transgressional phase with smaller channels where oncolites were laid down. The river systems on both sides of the Montsec were sourced by the easternmost parts of the present Pyrenees, with the Empordà High as provenance area. This east-to-west fluvial system, contrary to the present-day west–east flowing direction of the Ebro Basin, persisted until the Late Eocene. The uppermost unit of the Maastrichtian sequence, the coarse-grained Reptile Sandstone, has been interpreted as a fast-flowing braided river channel.
 The start of the Paleocene was marked by a more tranquil deposition of lacustrine character. It has been hypothesized that the Alpine orogeny during this phase was less active and/or a regional rise in sea level allowed the basin to be flooded. During this phase, the limestones of Vallcebre and its lateral equivalents were deposited in the lake.
 A renewed phase of tectonic activity reactivated the fluvial to alluvial sedimentation, with abundant conglomerates and conglomeratic sandstones as a result. The provenance area for these uppermost sections of the Tremp Formation were first interpreted as the presently high mountains of the Axial Zone of the Pyrenees, at that time a forming orogen. Detailed provenance analysis published in 2015 by Gómez et al. however shows that the Àger basin was fed from the south (Prades area) and the Cadí-Vallcebre area was fed from the southeast (Montseny area), both areas belonging to the Ebro Massif. The Pyrenean basement (Axial Zone) was not a source area during the sedimentation of the Tremp Formation. The latest phase of depositional evolution is noted in a wider area in the Pre-Pyrenees and to the south in the Ebro Basin, that began its formation during the Eocene, building up to its present shape in Oligocene and Miocene times.

Cretaceous-Paleogene boundary 

The Tremp Formation spans the latest stage of the Cretaceous (Maastrichtian) and the earliest stages of the Paleocene (Danian and Thanetian). This has made the formation one of a few European unique localities to study the K/T boundary. In the Tremp Basin, the boundary is registered at Coll de Nargó, Isona and Fontllonga and established on the basis of paleomagnetism and a strong decrease of ∂13C and ∂18O isotopes. The typical iridium layer, found in other sites where the Cretaceous-Paleogene boundary has been noted, as Gubbio in Italy and Caravaca in Spain, has not been registered in the Tremp Formation.

Paleontology 

The Tremp Formation provided many fossilized dinosaur eggs. A great number of nests are visible as well as numerous fragments of egg shells. The presence of wave ripples indicates a beach-like environment where dinosaurs laid their eggs for a long time. Many eggs are found in groups of between four and seven gatherings, indicating the in situ preservation of the nests.

Also, remains of several genera of dinosaurs are described from the Tremp Formation. The Tremp and underlying Arén Formations are the richest sites for dinosaur fossils in the Pyrenees, with only at Basturs more than 1000 bone fragments found. The dinosaur paleofauna has been compared to Hațeg in Romania, famous for the pterodactyl Hatzegopteryx named after the location. Furthermore, a rich variety of other reptiles, among which the new species and youngest fossil record of the Cretaceous turtle Polysternon; Polysternon isonae, as well as amphibians, lizards, fish, and mammals, for example the earliest Paleocene multituberculate Hainina pyrenaica, have been registered, showing a unique faunal assemblage for the Cretaceous-Paleogene boundary, not found elsewhere in Europe.

The holes found on the dip slope at Ermita La Posa were initially interpreted as tracks produced by sauropod dinosaurs. Later investigations and interpretations of the depositional environment of the Maastrichtian; the coastal origin of the trackbed with plenty of marine invertebrates, have led researchers to interpret part of the ichnofossils as feeding traces of rays in the intertidal zones. During their feeding activity, the rays produce holes in the top sedimentary layers, when they feed on marine invertebrates buried in the top sediment.

The Reptile Sandstone, when identified as a separate unit, was called as such because of the great abundance of fossil chelonid turtles, Bothremydidae, crocodile teeth, theropod limbs, and hadrosaur femurs.

Sauropod nesting sites 

A detailed analysis of the nesting sites of Coll de Nargó, at the Pinyes locality, has been performed in 2010 by Vilat et al. The eggs were found in the lower portion of the Lower Red Garumnian, with local facies comprising calcareous silty mudstones, very fine to fine-grained sand bodies, and medium to coarse-grained sandstones.

Most eggs exposed at the Pinyes locality were incompletely preserved because of recent erosion; however, excavation occasionally revealed relatively intact specimens in the subsurface. Some eggs exposed in cross-section revealed numerous eggshell fragments, predominantly oriented concave up within the mudstone matrix that filled the egg interior. Radial thin sections and SEM images of the eggshells showed a single structural layer of calcite. The eggshell surfaces displayed abundant elliptical pore openings that varied from 65 to 120 microns in width.

The mudstones surrounding the eggs displayed extensive bioturbation, minor faults, and penetrative foliation with a northeast–southwest orientation. Eggshell fragments were often displaced and overlap one another, and the eggs exhibited significant deformation due to compression. Most eggs mapped in the field showed a long axis direction 044, thus having a general northeast–southwest orientation, which coincides with regional stress fields resulting from tectonic compression.

The eggs, in clusters or "clutches" of up to 28 individual eggs, were described as Megaloolithus siruguei, an oospecies well documented from various localities in northern Catalonia and southern France. The description was done on the basis of egg size, shape, eggshell microstructure, tuberculate ornamentation, and the presence of transversal canals in a tubocanaliculate pore system, an unequivocal feature of this oospecies. The egg horizons within the Tremp Formation were continuous before the tectonic inversion phase of the basin. The compressional tectonic regime produced structural deformation of the egg-bearing strata. The dip of the beds in the mountainous region can contribute to misinterpretation of reproductive behavior, hence the analysis of the eggs in combination with tectonic stresses gives a more complete picture of the shapes of the eggs.

An interpretation of the nest excavation at Pinyes was made and compared to other nesting sites of sauropods found all over the world, in particular in the Aix Basin of southern France, the Allen and Anacleto Formations of Argentina, and the Lameta Formation of India. The nest sizes and shapes of Pinyes show great similarities with the other analyzed sites.

A common nest size of 25 eggs has been suggested for the Pinyes locality. Small egg clusters that display linear or grouped egg arrangements reported at Pinyes and other localities likely reflect recent erosion. The distinct clutch geometry reported at Pinyes and other megaloolithid localities worldwide, strongly suggests a common reproductive behavior that resulted from the use of the hind foot for scratch-digging during nest excavation. Due to their size and weight, the titanosaurs could not heat the eggs by direct body contact, so must have relied on external environmental heat for incubating their eggs. However, modern megapode birds as the maleo (Macrocephalon maleo), the Moluccan megapode (Eulipoa wallacei) and scrubfowls (Megapodius spp.) in Southeast Asia and Australia, burrow their eggs using the heat in the top soil to incubate them and provide protection from predators. The egg spatial distribution, in small clusters linearly to compactly grouped, but contained in round shaped areas of up to  would either support burrow- or mound-nesting at Pinyes.

Hadrosaur ichnofossils 

Over 45 fossil localities yielded hadrosaurid fossils in the Lower Red Garumnian of the eastern Tremp Syncline. Various new specimens of indeterminate Lambeosaurinae were described in 2013 by Prieto Márquez et al. Furthermore, many hadrosaur ichnofossils have been found in the Tremp Formation and were analyzed in great detail by Vila et al. in 2013. The most abundant track types in fluvial settings are the pedal prints of hadrosaurs, while titanosaur ichnofossils and a single theropod track were found in lagoonal environments. The authors concluded:
 The fluvial lower red unit of the Tremp Formation exhibits meandering and braided fluvial systems with favorable conditions for track production and preservation, like those of North America and Asia.
 The dinosaurs mainly produced the tracks on the floodplain, within the channels, and on and within crevasse splay deposits in low water stage conditions, and the footprints were infilled by sands during high water stage (stream reactivation).
 The track record is composed of abundant hadrosaur and scarce sauropod and theropod tracks. The hadrosaur tracks are significantly smaller in size but morphologically similar to comparable records in North America and Asia. They are attributable to the ichnogenus Hadrosauropodus.
 A rich track succession composed of more than 40 distinct track levels indicates that hadrosaur footprints are found above the early Maastrichtian–late Maastrichtian boundary and most noticeably in the late Maastrichtian, with tracks occurring abundantly in the Mesozoic part of the C29r magnetochron, during the last 300,000 years of the Cretaceous.
 The occurrence of hadrosaur tracks in the Ibero-Armorican island seems to be characteristic of the late Maastrichtian time interval and thus they are important biochronostratigraphic markers in the faunal successions of the Late Cretaceous in southwestern Europe.

Fossil content 

{| class="wikitable sortable"
! Group !! Name !! Member !! Image !! class=unsortable | Notes
|-
| rowspan=8 valign=top | Mammals || Afrodon ivani || MP 6 mammal zone || || align=center | 
|-
| Nosella europaea || MP 6 || || align=center | 
|-
| Teilhardimys musculus || MP 6 || || align=center | 
|-
| Paschatherium cf. dolloi || MP 6 || || align=center | 
|-
| Adapisorex sp. || MP 6 || || align=center | 
|-
| Hainina pyrenaica || MP 6 || || align=center | 
|-
| Pleuraspidotherium sp. || upper ||  || align=center | 
|-
| Condylarthra indet. || MP 6 || || align=center | 
|-
| rowspan=7 valign=top | Crocodiles || Allodaposuchus hulki || Conquès || || align=center | 
|-
| Allodaposuchus palustris || Grey Garumnian ||  || align=center | 
|-
| Allodaposuchus precedens || La Posa ||  || align=center | 
|-
| Agaresuchus subjuniperus || Conquès ||  || align=center | 
|-
| Arenysuchus gascabadiolorum || Conquès ||  || align=center | 
|-
| Acynodon sp. || Conquès ||  || align=center | 
|-
| Crocodylia indet. || La PosaReptile Sst. || || align=center | 
|-
| Lizards || Lacertilia indet. || La Posa || || align=center | 
|-
| rowspan=6 valign=top | Turtles || Polysternon isonae || Conquès || || align=center | 
|-
| Solemys sp. || Grey Garumnian || || align=center | 
|-
| Testudinata indet. || La Posa || || align=center | 
|-
| Chelonii indet. || Reptile Sst. || || align=center | 
|-
| Bothremydidae indet. || ConquèsReptile Sst. || || align=center | 
|-
| Helochelydrinae indet. || Conquès || || align=center | 
|-
| Ankylosaurs || Nodosauridae indet. || La Posa || || align=center | 
|-
| rowspan=7 valign=top | Hadrosaurs || Adynomosaurus arcanus || Conquès ||  || align=center | 
|-
| Arenysaurus ardevoli || Conquès ||  || align=center | 
|-
| Koutalisaurus kohlerorum || ||  || align=center | 
|-
| Pararhabdodon isonensis || Conquès ||  || align=center | 
|-
| cf. Orthomerus sp. || La Posa ||  || align=center | 
|-
| Hadrosauria indet. || La PosaReptile Sst. || || align=center | 
|-
| Lambeosaurinae indet. || La Posa || || align=center | 
|-
| Iguanodonts || Iguanodontidae indet. || La Posa || || align=center | 
|-
| rowspan="2" |Rhabdodontids
| [[Pareisactus|Pareisactus evrostos]] || Conquès ||  || align=center | 
|-
|Rhabdodon priscus || La Posa ||  || align=center | 
|-
| rowspan="6" |Sauropods
|Abditosaurus kuehnei || Conquès|| || align=center | 
|-
| Titanosaurus cf. indicus || La Posa ||  || align="center" | 
|-
| ?Hypselosaurus priscus || La Posa ||  || align=center | Ullastre & Masriera, 1998, p.115
|-
| Sauropoda indet. || Grey Garumnian || || align=center | 
|-
| Somphospondyli indet. || Conquès || || align=center | 
|-
| Titanosauria indet. || La Posa || || align=center | 
|-
| rowspan="8" valign="top" | Theropods || Richardoestesia sp. || La PosaConquès ||  || align=center | 
|-
| ?Paronychodon sp. || Conquès ||  || align=center | 
|-
|?Pyroraptor olympius|| La Posa |||| align="center" |
|-
| Tamarro insperatus || Talarn || || align=center | 
|-
| Coelurosauria indet. || La Posa || || align=center | 
|-
| Maniraptoriformes indet. || Conquès || || align=center | 
|-
| ?Megalosauridae indet. (Abelisauridae) || La Posa || || align=center | 
|-
| ?Neoceratosauria indet. || La Posa || || align=center | 
|-
| Theropoda indet. || Reptile Sst. || || align=center | 
|-
| rowspan=2 valign=top | Lizards || Anguidae indet. || Conquès || || align=center | 
|-
| Scleroglossa indet. || Conquès || || align=center | 
|-
| Snakes || Alethinophidia indet. || Conquès || || align=center | 
|-
| Squamata || Squamata indet. || Conquès || || align=center | 
|-
| rowspan=6 valign=top | Eggs || Cairanoolithus roussetensis || upper || || align=center | 
|-
| Megaloolithus aureliensis || upper || || align=center | 
|-
| Megaloolithus baghensis || La PosaConquèsLower Red Garumnian || || align=center | Orcau-1 at Fossilworks.orgSerrat de Pelleu at Fossilworks.org
|-
| Megaloolithus mamillare || La PosaConquèsLower Red Garumnian || || align=center | Costa de la Coma at Fossilworks.org
|-
| Megaloolithus siruguei || ConquèsGrey GarumnianLower Red Garumnian || || align=center | Bravo et al., 2005, p.54
|-
| Prismatoolithidae indet. || Conquès || || align=center | 
|-
| rowspan=6 valign=top | Ichnofossils || Ornithopodichnites magna || La Posa || || align=center | 
|-
| Orcauichnites garumniensis || La Posa || || align=center | 
|-
| Hadrosauropodus sp. || ConquèsLower Red Garumnian || || align=center | Cingles del Boixader at Fossilworks.org
|-
| Ophiomorpha sp. || upper || || align=center | 
|-
| Spirographites ellipticus || Conquès || || align=center | 
|-
| Taenidium barretti, T. bowni,Arenicolites isp., Loloichnus isp.,Palaeophycus isp., Planolites isp. || Lower Red Garumnian || || align=center | 
|-
| rowspan=4 valign=top | Amphibians || Albanerpeton nexuosus || Conquès ||  || align=center | 
|-
| aff. Paradiscoglossus sp. || Conquès || || align=center | 
|-
| Amphibia indet. || Conquès || || align=center | 
|-
| Palaeobatrachidae indet. || Conquès || || align=center | 
|-
| rowspan=7 valign=top | Fish || Coupatezia trempina,Paratrygonorrhina amblysoda,Hemiscyllium sp., Lamniformes indet. || La Posa || || align=center | 
|-
| Igdabatis indicus, Rhombodus ibericus || La Posa || || align=center | 
|-
| Batoidea indet. || La Posa || || align=center | 
|-
| Lepisosteidae indet. || Conquès || || align=center | 
|-
| Osteichthyes indet. || La Posa || || align=center | 
|-
| Pycnodontiformes indet. || Conquès || || align=center | 
|-
| Teleostei indet. || Conquès || || align=center | 
|-
| rowspan=3 valign=top | Bivalves || Apricardia sicoris,Hippuritella castroi, H. lapeirousei,Radiolitella pulchellus || lower || || align=center | 
|-
| Corbicula laletana || || || align=center | 
|-
| Ostrea garumnica || La Posa || || align=center | 
|-
| rowspan=2 valign=top | Rudists || Hippurites castroi || || || align=center | 
|-
| Praeradiolites boucheroni || lower || || align=center | 
|-
| rowspan=7 valign=top | Gastropods || Pyrgulifera cf. stillens || La Posa || || align=center | 
|-
| Cerithium sp. || Grey Garumnian || || align=center | 
|-
| Cyclophorus sp. || La Posa || || align=center |  
|-
| Lychnus sp. || La Posa || || align=center | 
|-
| Melanoides sp. || La Posa || || align=center | 
|-
| Neritina sp. || La Posa || || align=center | 
|-
| Pyrgulifera sp. || Grey Garumnian || || align=center | 
|-
| Ostracods || Ilyocypris colloti || Grey Garumnian || || align=center | 
|-
| rowspan=13 valign=top | Flora || Celastrophyllum bilobatum || Grey Garumnian || || align=center | 
|-
| Cinnamomophyllum vicente-castellum || Grey Garumnian || || align=center | 
|-
| Cornophyllum herendeenensis || Grey Garumnian || || align=center | 
|-
| Menispermophyllum isonensis || Grey Garumnian || || align=center | 
|-
| Saliciphyllum serratum || Grey Garumnian || || align=center | 
|-
| Dicotylophyllum cf. proteoides || Grey Garumnian || || align=center | 
|-
| Sabalites cf. longirhachis || Grey Garumnian || || align=center | 
|-
| Alnophyllum sp. || Grey Garumnian || || align=center | 
|-
| Betuliphyllum sp. || Grey Garumnian || || align=center | 
|-
| Daphnogene sp. || Grey Garumnian || || align=center | 
|-
| Ettingshausenia sp. || Grey Garumnian || || align=center | 
|-
| Myrtophyllum sp. || Grey Garumnian || || align=center | 
|-
| Tracheophyta indet. || Grey Garumnian || || align=center | 
|-
| rowspan=5 valign=top | Algae || Amblyochara concava || Conquès || || align=center | 
|-
| Peckichara sertulata || Conquès || || align=center | 
|-
| Microchara cristata, M. nana,M. punctata, M. aff. laevigata || || || align=center | 
|-
| Nitellopsis (Campaniella) paracolensis,Microchara sp., Vidaliella gerundensis || upper || || align=center | 
|-
| Feistiella sp. || Conquès || || align=center | 
|-
| Fungi || Microcodium || || || align=center | 
|-
| Cyanobacteria || Girvanella || || || align=center | 
|- 
|}

Pollen

 Polypodiaceoisporites gracicingulis, P. maximus, P. tatabanyensis, P. vitiosus Leiotriletes adriennis, L. dorogensis, L. microadriennis Cycadopites kyushuensis, C. minar Monocolpopollenites dorogensis, M. tranquillus Semioculopollis croxtonae, S. praedicatus Cicatricosisporites cf. triangulus Cupressacites insulipapillatus Cupuliferoipollenites pusillus Cyrillaceaepollenites barghoorniacus Granulatisporites palaeogenicus Inaperturopollenites giganteus Labraferoidaepollenites menatensis Laevigatosporites haardti Minorpollis hojstrupensis Nudopollis minutus Oculopollis cf. minoris Pityosporites insignis Plicapollis serta Punctatisporites luteticus Retitricolporites andreanszkyi Rugulitriporites pflugi Subtriporopollenites constans Suemigipollis cf. triangulus Tetracolporopollenites halimbaense Trilobosporites (Tuberosisporites) Vacuopollis cf. concavux Granomonocolpites Patellasporites Platycaryapollenites Polyporites Retimonocolpites''

Research and exhibitions 

Every year, over 800 geologists visit El Pallars Jussà and more than 1500 university students from all over Europe come to the Tremp-Graus Basin to carry out their geological fieldwork. The basin is also regarded by petroleum companies as a perfect place to study the interplay of tectonic movements with the different types of lithologies. The Museu Comarcal de Ciències Naturals ("Local District Natural Science Museum") in Tremp, built attached to the Torre de Soldevila in the center of town, is a popular destination for school visits. It houses a permanent fossil exhibition with a wide variety of remains, ranging from dinosaurs to fossilized invertebrates such as corals, bivalves, gastropods, and more.

The Museu de la Conca Dellà of Isona houses replicas of bone remains, restorations of dinosaurs and an authentic nest of eggs, left behind by the last dinosaurs to have lived in the valley during the Cretaceous period. The museum also contains numerous other archaeological remains from the Roman settlement of Isona. In recent years, the Consell Comarcal (Regional Council) has promoted several new initiatives, including the creation of a geological program especially adapted to local schools and a series of guided visits to the main archaeological sites of the region.

The unique paleoenvironment, well-exposed geology, and importance as national heritage have sparked proposals to designate the Tremp Formation and its region as a protected geological site of interest, much like the Aliaga geological park and others in Spain. After having been filed as a candidate since 2016, the Tremp Basin and surrounding areas as El Pallars Jussà, Baix Pallars to Pallars Sobirà, Coll de Nargó to l'Alt Urgell, Vilanova de Meià, Camarasa and Àger to the Noguera were included as a UNESCO Global Geopark, and included in the Global Geoparks Network. On April 17, 2018, UNESCO accepted the proposal and designated the site as Conca de Tremp-Montsec Global Geopark, stating:

"This area is internationally recognized as a natural laboratory for sedimentology, tectonics, external geodynamics, palaeontology, ore deposits and pedology. In addition, other natural and cultural heritage is also remarkable including astronomy and archaeological sites."

Panoramas

See also 

 List of dinosaur-bearing rock formations
 List of Vertebrate fauna of the Maastrichtian stage
 Timeline of Cretaceous–Paleogene extinction event research
 Climate across Cretaceous–Paleogene boundary
 Geology of the Pyrenees
 Hell Creek Formation - Cretaceous-Paleogene contemporaneous fossiliferous formation of the United States
 Cerrejón Formation - Paleocene contemporaneous fossiliferous formation of Colombia

Notes and references

Notes

References

Bibliography

Regional geology

Local geology

Salt tectonics

Paleontology publications

Dinosaurs

Other groups

Further reading

External links 
  Formation of the Pyrenees

 
Geologic formations of Spain
Paleontology in Spain
Paleontological sites of Europe
Fossiliferous stratigraphic units of Europe
Upper Cretaceous Series of Europe
Paleocene Series of Europe
Cretaceous Spain
Maastrichtian Stage
Danian Stage
Thanetian Stage
Sandstone formations
Shale formations
Limestone formations
Siltstone formations
Conglomerate formations
Marl formations
Coal in Spain
Fluvial deposits
Lacustrine deposits
Alluvial deposits
Deltaic deposits
Evaporite deposits
Formations
Pre-Pyrenees
Global Geoparks Network members